Let Love is the twelfth studio album by American rapper Common. The album was released on August 30, 2019, by Loma Vista Recordings and Concord Records. The album features guest appearances from Samora Pinderhughes, Daniel Caesar, Swizz Beatz, Leikeli47, BJ the Chicago Kid, A-Trak, Jill Scott, Leon Bridges and Jonathan McReynolds.

Singles
The album's first single "HER Love" featuring Daniel Caesar was released on June 14, 2019.

Track listing

Charts

References

2019 albums
Common (rapper) albums
Loma Vista Recordings albums
Albums produced by Karriem Riggins
Albums produced by J Dilla